Sanjay Dutt is an Indian actor known for his work in Hindi films. He made his acting debut in 1981, opposite Tina Ambani, in his father Sunil Dutt's romantic action film Rocky (1981). Rocky was ranked at tenth highest-grossing Bollywood films of 1981. After appearing in a series of box office flops, he starred in Mahesh Bhatt's crime thriller film Naam (1986). Dutt received critical acclaim for his performance, and it became a turning point in his career.

In 1991, Dutt appeared in Lawrence D'Souza's Indian romantic drama film Saajan (1991), starring alongside Madhuri Dixit and Salman Khan. For his performance, Dutt was nominated for the Filmfare Award for Best Actor. He was nominated again for the same award for his performance in Khalnayak (1993). Dutt won the Filmfare Award for Best Actor—for portraying a young man who later becomes a gangster in Vaastav: The Reality (1999). He also received critical acclaim for his performance. Dutt next appeared in Vidhu Vinod Chopra's crime thriller film Mission Kashmir (2000). For his performance, Dutt was nominated for the Filmfare Award for Best Actor.

In 2003, Dutt appeared in Rajkumar Hirani's directorial debut: comedy-drama film Munna Bhai M.B.B.S. (2003). He played Munna Bhai, who attends medical school to obtain an MBBS degree. The film was successful at the box office, grossing  in India and  worldwide. Dutt won Filmfare Award for Best Performance in a Comic Role.

In 2006, Dutt starred alongside Arshad Warsi, Vidya Balan, and Boman Irani in Rajkumar Hirani's comedy-drama film Lage Raho Munna Bhai (2006), the sequel to in the sequel to Munna Bhai M.B.B.S.. The film received critical acclaim, and Dutt went on to win several awards, including Screen Award for Best Actor (Critics), and Zee Cine Critics Award for Best Actor – Male. Dutt has frequently collaborated with directors Rajkumar Hirani, Vidhu Vinod Chopra, and Mahesh Bhatt. Apart from acting, Dutt has hosted season 5 of Bigg Boss (2011—2012) alongside Salman Khan.

Film 

Indian filmographies
Male actor filmographies
Sanjay Dutt

Indian filmographies
Male actor filmographies
Sanjay Dutt

Television

References

External links